Schweizer's reagent is the metal ammine complex with the formula [Cu(NH3)4(H2O)2](OH)2. This deep-blue compound is used in purifying cellulose.

It is prepared by dissolving copper(II) hydroxide in a solution of ammonia.

It forms an azure solution. Evaporation of these solutions leaves light blue residue of copper hydroxide, reflecting the lability of the copper-ammonia bonding. If conducted under a stream of ammonia, then deep blue needle-like crystals of the tetrammine form. In presence of oxygen, concentrated solutions give rise to nitrites Cu(NO2)2(NH3)n. The nitrite results from oxidation of the ammonia.

Reactions with cellulose
Schweizer's reagent was once used in production of cellulose products such as rayon and cellophane (see cupro). Cellulose, which is quite insoluble in water (hence its utility as clothing), dissolves in the presence of Schweizer's reagent. Using the reagent, cellulose can be extracted from wood pulp, cotton fiber, and other natural cellulose sources. Cellulose precipitates when the solution is acidified. It functions by binding to vicinal diols.

Presently, the reagent is used in the analysis of the molecular weight of cellulose samples.

History
These properties of Schweizer's reagent were discovered by the Swiss chemist Matthias Eduard Schweizer (1818–1860), after whom the reagent is named.

See also
 Tetraamminecopper(II) sulfate

Footnotes

References

Copper complexes
Hydroxides
Ammine complexes